Prof. Saugata Roy (born 6 August 1946) is an Indian politician of Trinamool Congress  and a member of parliament in the Lok Sabha of the Indian Parliament representing the Dum Dum constituency in the 16th Lok Sabha. He was the Union Minister of State for Urban Development in the Manmohan Singh government.

A National Science Talent Search Scholar and a former student of St. Lawrence High School, Kolkata, Jogesh Chandra Chaudhuri Law College and Presidency College, Kolkata, he holds a post-graduate degree in Physics. He also holds a degree in Law from Calcutta University. He is a retired professor of Physics from Asutosh College.

A veteran politician from West Bengal, senior leader of Trinamool Congress, he was elected to the 15th Lok Sabha from the Dum Dum constituency and re-elected to the 16th Lok Sabha from the same constituency. He had earlier been elected from Barrackpore (Lok Sabha constituency) in 1977. He was briefly the Union Minister of State for Petroleum in the Charan Singh Ministry and was the Union Minister of State for Urban Development in the UPA II Ministry from 2009 to 2012. He has been elected to the West Bengal State Legislative Assembly five times having been elected from Alipore (3 Terms), Dhakuria and Bangaon constituencies.

From 1967 to 1969 he was General Secretary, West Bengal Chhatra Parishad and from  1973 to 1977 he was General Secretary, West Bengal Pradesh Congress Committee.

On 11 January 2017, Bharatiya Janata Party MP Babul Supriyo filed a complaint against Roy along with AITC MP Tapas Paul and MLA Mahua Moitra for falsely accusing him of being involved in the Rose Valley ponzi firm scam.

Prof. Roy serves on the following committees as a Member of Parliament:
 Member, Committee on Public Undertakings (14 Aug. 2014 - 30 April 2016)
 Member, Rules Committee (1 Sep. 2014–Present)
 Member, Standing Committee on Finance (1 Sep. 2014–Present)
 Member, Consultative Committee, Ministry of Defense (1 Sep. 2014–Present)
 Member, Joint Committee on Office of Profit (11 Dec. 2014–Present)
 Member, Joint Committee on Security in Parliament House Complex (29 April 2015 – Present)

References

External links

Living people
Presidency University, Kolkata alumni
Jogesh Chandra Chaudhuri Law College alumni
University of Calcutta alumni
Academic staff of the University of Calcutta
India MPs 2009–2014
1946 births
India MPs 1977–1979
Trinamool Congress politicians from West Bengal
West Bengal MLAs 1987–1991
West Bengal MLAs 1991–1996
West Bengal MLAs 1996–2001
West Bengal MLAs 2001–2006
West Bengal MLAs 2006–2011
Lok Sabha members from West Bengal
People from Alipore
State cabinet ministers of West Bengal
India MPs 2014–2019
People from Shillong
People from North 24 Parganas district
India MPs 2019–present